Lyudmila Mikhaylovna Matveyeva (born 1 February 1957) is a Soviet long-distance runner. She competed in the 10,000 metres at the 1988 Summer Olympics and the 1992 Summer Olympics.

References

1957 births
Living people
Athletes (track and field) at the 1988 Summer Olympics
Athletes (track and field) at the 1992 Summer Olympics
Soviet female long-distance runners
Olympic athletes of the Soviet Union
Olympic athletes of the Unified Team
Place of birth missing (living people)